The wedding of Prince Andrew and Sarah Ferguson was held on 23 July 1986, at Westminster Abbey in London, England.

Courtship and engagement 
Prince Andrew, the third child and second son of Queen Elizabeth II and Prince Philip, Duke of Edinburgh, and Sarah Ferguson, the daughter of Major Ronald Ferguson and his first wife Susan Wright, first met when they were children, but had not been romantically involved until they met again at a party at Floors Castle in 1985. They began their relationship that very same year, after a party held at Windsor Castle in honour of the Royal Ascot races. Diana, Princess of Wales, Andrew's sister-in-law, played a hand in matchmaking the couple, and the two women later formed a strong friendship.

Andrew proposed to Sarah on 19 February 1986, his twenty-sixth birthday. Their engagement was announced on 17 March 1986. Andrew presented Sarah with a Garrard engagement ring made from sketches he had made. The ring has a Burma ruby surrounded by ten drop-diamonds. The mounting was eighteen-carat white and yellow gold. Andrew's bachelor party was held at Aubrey House in Holland Park. It was attended by Prince Charles, Billy Connolly, David Frost and Elton John.

Wedding ceremony 

Four months after announcing their engagement, Andrew and Sarah married on 23 July 1986, at Westminster Abbey in London. The Lord Chamberlain's office was responsible for organising the ceremony and guest list, while the royal household was left in charge of the reception. Sarah made her way with her father Ronald from Clarence House in the Glass Coach, arriving at the church at 11:30. The Archbishop of Canterbury Robert Runcie conducted at the 45-minute wedding ceremony. As the couple exchanged vows, Sarah mistakenly repeated Andrew's middle name, Christian; five years earlier, Diana, Princess of Wales, made a similar mistake by reversing the order of Prince Charles's names. Unlike the wedding of Prince Charles and Lady Diana, Sarah chose to say the word "obey" in her vow "to love, cherish and to obey." In keeping with tradition, the wedding ring was crafted from Welsh gold. The tradition of using Welsh gold within the wedding rings of the royal family dates back to 1923.

Both Andrew's brothers participated in the wedding ceremony; Prince Edward was his best man, and Prince Charles read a lesson during the service. The bridesmaids and page boys included Princess Anne's children Peter and Zara Phillips, and Prince Charles's eldest son Prince William. Members of foreign royal families, as well as the U.S. First Lady Nancy Reagan were among the guests. The ceremony featured many ceremonial aspects, including use of the state carriages and roles for the Household Cavalry.

The Duke and Duchess of York left Westminster Abbey for Buckingham Palace in an open-top 1902 State Landau. Around 100,000 people gathered to witness the Andrew and Sarah's first kiss as man and wife on the balcony of the palace. After a traditional wedding breakfast for 120 guests at Buckingham Palace, the married couple and some 300 guests moved to a party at Claridge's hotel.

The 5½-foot-tall "marzipan and rum-soaked" wedding cake was supplied by the navy supply school HMS Raleigh. They made two identical cakes in case one was damaged. 100 cakes were offered at a competition held by the palace, and subsequently they were all donated to hospices. 30,000 flowers were used to decorate the abbey, all of which were eventually also donated to hospices. Albert Mackenzie Watson was chosen by Prince Andrew to take the wedding portraits.

Clothing 

Prince Andrew was dressed in a ceremonial attire of a naval lieutenant, while Sarah wore an ivory-silk wedding dress designed by Lindka Cierach, which had a 17-foot train, and 20-foot-long veil. Sarah, in her own words, "lost 26 pounds to fit into" the dress. Her S-shaped bouquet featured "gardenias, cream lilies, yellow roses, lilies of the valley and a sprig of myrtle." Sarah wore a floral crown for the occasion which was placed atop a diamond tiara that was given to her by the Queen.

Best man, bridesmaids and page boys 

Best man
The Prince Edward, age 22, younger brother of the groom.

Bridesmaids and page boys:
Lady Rosanagh Innes-Ker, age: 7 the daughter of Guy Innes-Ker, 10th Duke of Roxburghe
Alice Ferguson, age: 6 younger half-sister of the bride. 
Laura Fellowes, age: 6 the daughter of Diana's sister Jane Fellowes, Baroness Fellowes
Zara Phillips age: 5 niece of the groom 

Andrew Ferguson, age: 8 half-brother of the bride 
Peter Phillips age: 8 nephew of the groom 
Seamus Luedecke, age: 5 nephew of the bride 
Prince William of Wales age: 4 nephew of the groom

Musical selection 
Organist & Choir Director: Simon Preston
 Laudate Dominum (from Vesperae solennes de confessore) by W. A. Mozart, sung by soprano Felicity Lott
 Exsultate, Jubilate by W. A. Mozart, sung by Arleen Auger
 Alleluja from motet Exsultate, Jubilate, sung by Arleen Auger
 Crown Imperial by William Walton

Titles upon marriage 
On the day of the wedding, the Queen granted Prince Andrew the titles of Duke of York, Earl of Inverness and Baron Killyleagh—the first two titles were previously held by his maternal great-grandfather King George V, and grandfather King George VI. By marriage, Sarah became Her Royal Highness The Duchess of York, Countess of Inverness and Baroness Killyleagh, also attaining the rank of Princess of the United Kingdom.

Honeymoon 
The Duke and Duchess of York made their way to Heathrow Airport in an open carriage, with a paper mache satellite dish and sign attached reading "Phone Home" put there as a practical joke by Prince Edward. The Princess of Wales and Viscount Linley, Princess Margaret's son, placed a king-sized teddy bear inside the coach. The couple boarded a royal jet, emblazoned with "Just Married" on the rear door, for the Azores Islands, and then spent their 5-day honeymoon aboard the royal yacht Britannia in the Atlantic.

Public reception 
The BBC reported that 500 million television viewers tuned in to watch the wedding of Prince Andrew, Duke of York, and Sarah Ferguson worldwide. An estimated crowd of 100,000 gathered to see the couple's first public kiss as man and wife on the balcony of Buckingham Palace. The wedding ceremony was positively received by the public. The media frenzy caused by the wedding was called "Fergie Fever" by The New York Times. A number of ceremonies and parties were held at different places by the public to celebrate the occasion across the United Kingdom. The wedding was widely broadcast on television and radio in many countries, and news channels covered the ceremony in different languages.

Guest list 
Notable guests in attendance included:

Relatives of the groom

House of Windsor
 The Queen and The Duke of Edinburgh, the groom's parents
 The Prince and Princess of Wales, the groom's brother and sister-in-law
 Prince William of Wales, the groom's nephew (pageboy)
 Prince Henry of Wales, the groom's nephew
 The Princess Anne, Mrs. Phillips and Captain Mark Phillips, the groom's sister and brother-in-law
 Peter Phillips, the groom's nephew (pageboy)
 Zara Phillips, the groom's niece (bridesmaid)
 The Prince Edward, the groom's brother
 Queen Elizabeth The Queen Mother, the groom's maternal grandmother
 The Princess Margaret, Countess of Snowdon, the groom's maternal aunt
 Viscount Linley,  the groom's first cousin
 Lady Sarah Armstrong-Jones, the groom's first cousin
 Princess Alice, Duchess of Gloucester, the groom's maternal great-aunt by marriage
 The Duke and Duchess of Gloucester, the groom's first cousin, once removed, and his wife
 Earl of Ulster, the groom's second cousin
 Lady Davina Windsor, the groom's second cousin
 Lady Rose Windsor, the groom's second cousin
 The Duke and Duchess of Kent, the groom's first cousin, once removed, and his wife
 Earl of St Andrews, the groom's second cousin
 Lady Helen Windsor, the groom's second cousin
 Princess Alexandra, The Hon. Mrs Ogilvy and The Hon. Angus Ogilvy, the groom's first cousin, once removed, and her husband
 James Ogilvy, the groom's second cousin
 Marina Ogilvy, the groom's second cousin
 Prince and Princess Michael of Kent, the groom's first cousin, once removed, and his wife
 Lord Frederick Windsor, the groom's second cousin
 Lady Gabriella Windsor, the groom's second cousin

Other descendants of Queen Victoria 
 Lady Mary Whitley, the groom's second cousin, once removed
 The Lady Saltoun, wife of the groom's third cousin, once removed

Mountbatten family
 The Dowager Marchioness of Milford Haven, widow of the groom's first cousin, once removed
 The Marquess of Milford Haven, the groom's second cousin
 Lord Ivar Mountbatten, the groom's second cousin
 The Countess Mountbatten of Burma and The Lord Brabourne, the groom's first cousin, once removed, and her husband
 Lord and Lady Romsey, the groom's second cousin and his wife
 The Hon. Michael-John Knatchbull, the groom's second cousin, and his wife
 Baroness and Baron Hubert du Breuil, the groom's second cousin and her husband
 Lady Amanda Knatchbull, the groom's second cousin
 The Hon. Philip Knatchbull, the groom's second cousin
 The Hon. Timothy Knatchbull, the groom's second cousin
 Lady Pamela and David Hicks, the groom's first cousin, once removed and her husband
 Ashley Hicks, the groom's second cousin
 India Hicks, the groom's second cousin

Bowes-Lyon family
 The Earl and Countess of Strathmore and Kinghorne, the groom's first cousin, once removed and his wife
 Lady Rose Anson, the groom's second cousin, twice removed (bridesmaid)

Relatives of the bride

Ferguson family
 Ronald and Susan Ferguson, the bride's father and stepmother
 Andrew Ferguson, the bride's paternal half-brother
 Alice Ferguson, the bride's paternal half-sister
 Susan and Héctor Barrantes, the bride's mother and stepfather
 Mrs and Mr William Alez Makim, the bride's sister and her husband
 Seamus Makim, the bride's nephew
 Lady Elmhirst, the bride's paternal grandmother

Wright family
 The Hon. Mrs FitzHerbert Wright, the bride's maternal grandmother
 Mrs and Mr Julian Salmond, the bride's maternal aunt and uncle
 The Lady and Lord Loch, the bride's maternal aunt and uncle
 Major Bryan Wright, the bride's maternal uncle

Foreign royalty

Members of reigning royal families
  The Crown Princess of Norway, wife of the groom's second cousin, once removed (representing the King of Norway) 
  Princess Margaretha, Mrs Ambler and Mr John Ambler, the groom's third cousin once removed, and her husband (representing the King of Sweden)
  Prince George Valdemar of Denmark, the groom's second cousin, once removed (representing the Queen of Denmark) 
  Infanta Elena of Spain, the grooms's second cousin, once removed (representing the King of Spain)
  Infanta Cristina of Spain, the grooms's second cousin, once removed
  Prince Philippe of Belgium, the groom's third cousin, once removed (representing the King of the Belgians)
  The Hereditary Grand Duke of Luxembourg, the groom's third cousin, once removed (representing the Grand Duke of Luxembourg)
  The Prince Hiro (representing the Emperor of Japan)
  The Hereditary Prince of Monaco (representing the Prince of Monaco)

Members of non-reigning royal families
 King Constantine II and Queen Anne-Marie of the Hellenes, the groom's second cousin and his wife, the groom's third cousin once removed
 Crown Prince Pavlos of Greece, the groom's second cousin, once removed
 Prince Nikolaos of Greece and Denmark, the groom's second cousin, once removed
 Princess Alexia of Greece and Denmark, the groom's second cousin, once removed
 Crown Prince Alexander and Crown Princess Katherine of Yugoslavia, the groom's second cousin, once removed, and his wife
 The Margrave and Margravine of Baden, the groom's first cousin and his wife
 Princess Marie Louise of Baden, the groom's first cousin, once removed
 Princess Margarita of Baden, the groom's first cousin
 Prince Nikola of Yugoslavia, the groom's first cousin, once removed
 Princess Katarina of Yugoslavia, the groom's first cousin once removed
 Prince and Princess George William of Hanover, the groom's paternal uncle and aunt
 Prince and Princess Georg of Hanover, the groom's first cousin and his wife
 Prince and Princess Karl of Hesse, the groom's first cousin and his wife
 Prince Christoph of Hesse, the groom's first cousin, once removed
 Princess Irina of Hesse, the groom's first cousin, once removed
 The Princess of Hesse and by Rhine, widow of the groom's first cousin, twice removed
 The Prince and Princess of Hohenlohe-Langenburg, the groom's first cousin and his wife
 Princess Cécile of Hohenlohe-Langenburg, the groom's first cousin, once removed
 Prince and Princess Andreas of Hohenlohe-Langenburg, the groom's first cousin and his wife
 Princess Beatrix of Hohenlohe-Langenburg, the groom's first cousin

Religious figures 
 The Most Rev. Robert Runcie, Archbishop of Canterbury, and Rosalind Runcie
 The Very Rev. Michael Mayne, Dean of Westminster
 The Right Rev. Edward Knapp-Fisher, Archdeacon of Westminster

Politicians and diplomats 
  Nancy Reagan, First Lady of the United States
  Margaret Thatcher, Prime Minister of the United Kingdom

Other notable guests 
 Arleen Auger
 Michael Caine
 Elton John and Renate Blauel
 Estée Lauder
 Felicity Lott
 Simon Preston
 The Duke and Duchess of Roxburghe
 Lady Rosanagh Innes-Ker
 Lady Jane and Robert Fellowes 
 Laura Fellowes
 The Duke and Duchess of Grafton
 The Dowager Duchess of Abercorn
 Sir William Heseltine

Aftermath 
It was reported that Andrew's obligations as a naval helicopter pilot meant that they only saw each other 40 days a year. Sarah received criticism  from the media about her weight, contributing to her stress and the couple's estrangement. Andrew and Sarah announced their separation on 19 March 1992, and divorced on 30 May 1996.

After the couple's divorce, Sarah lost the style Her Royal Highness, becoming "Sarah, Duchess of York", and she was no longer a British princess.

References

External links 

 Wedding of Prince Andrew and Sarah Ferguson at the BBC.co.uk
 Order of Service for the wedding

1986 in British television
1986 in London
Andrew and Sarah Ferguson
Andrew and Sarah Ferguson
July 1986 events in the United Kingdom
Andrew and Sarah Ferguson
1980s in the City of Westminster
Prince Andrew, Duke of York